Baldomero is a given name. Related names include Voldemar (Estonian), Waldemar and Woldemar (German) and Vladimir (Slavic).

Notable people with the name include:

Baldomero Aguinaldo (1869–1915), leader of the Philippine Revolution
Baldomero Espartero, Prince of Vergara (1793–1879), Spanish general and political figure
Baldomero Falcones (born 1946), chairman and CEO of Fomento de Construcciones y Contratas
Baldomero Lillo (1867–1923), Chilean Naturalist author, whose works had social protest as their main theme
Baldomero Lopez (1925–1950), first lieutenant in the United States Marine Corps during the Korean War
Baldomero Olivera (born 1941), Filipino American chemist known for discovery of many cone snail toxins
Baldomero Sanín Cano (1861–1957), Colombian essayist, journalist, linguist, humanist and university professor

See also
 Saint Baldomerus (French Galmier de Lyon), patron saint of locksmiths, saint's day February 27 (Eastern Orthodox liturgics)

Masculine given names